The West Point Bicentennial silver dollar is a commemorative coin issued by the United States Mint in 2002.

See also

 List of United States commemorative coins and medals (2000s)
 United States commemorative coins

References

2002 establishments in the United States
Modern United States commemorative coins
United States dollar coins
United States silver coins